The 1970–71 season was the 62nd year of football played by Dundee United, and covers the period from 1 July 1970 to 30 June 1971. United finished in sixth place in the First Division.

Match results
Dundee United played a total of 44 competitive matches during the 1970–71 season.

Legend

All results are written with Dundee United's score first.
Own goals in italics

First Division

Scottish Cup

League Cup

Inter-Cities Fairs Cup

References

See also
 1970–71 in Scottish football

Dundee United F.C. seasons
Dundee United